The Saturn INT-21 was a study for an American orbital launch vehicle of the 1970s. It was derived from the Saturn V rocket used for the Apollo program, using its first and second stages, but lacking the third stage. The guidance unit would be moved from the top of the third stage to the top of the second stage. The INT-21 was never flown.

A related variant was launched once, from the Kennedy Space Center, Florida carrying the Skylab space station into orbit, at 17:30 UTC, on May 14, 1973. As Skylab was built from an S-IVB stage, there was no need to move the guidance unit. This version was intended to be used for other flights in the Apollo Applications Program, and would have also been used to launch other American space stations, including Skylab B.

See also

Comparison of orbital launch systems
Apollo program
Saturn I
Saturn IB
Saturn V
Skylab
Apollo Applications Program
S-IC
S-II
Saturn I SA-1

References

External links 
 Saturn INT-21 in Encyclopedia Astronautica
 Skylab, US Centennial of Flight Commission

1973 in spaceflight
INT-21
Cancelled space launch vehicles